Carolina Barret (21 October 1916 – 13 October 2010) was a Mexican film actress.

Selected filmography
 Such Is My Country (1937)
 Narciso's Hard Luck (1940)
 The Unknown Policeman (1941)
 La razón de la culpa (1942)
 María Eugenia (1943)
 Beautiful Michoacán (1943)
 Tragic Wedding (1946)
 Five Faces of Woman (1947)
 Fly Away, Young Man! (1947)
 Opium (1949)
 Hotel Room (1953)
 Tívoli (1974)
 41, el hombre perfecto (1982)

References

Bibliography 
 Rogelio Agrasánchez. Guillermo Calles: A Biography of the Actor and Mexican Cinema Pioneer. McFarland, 2010.

External links 
 

1916 births
2010 deaths
Mexican film actresses